Huamanmarca (possibly from Quechua waman falcon, marka village) (also spelled Huamanmarka or Wamanmarka) is an archaeological site in the region of Cusco, Peru. It is located in Huayopata District, La Convención Province, on the right bank of the Luq'umayu.

See also 
 Allpamayu
 Luq'umayu
 Inka Tampu
 Willka Wiqi

References 

Archaeological sites in Peru
Archaeological sites in Cusco Region